Hillview Estates, Alberta may refer to:

Hillview Estates, Parkland County, Alberta, a locality in Parkland County, Alberta
Hillview Estates, Lac Ste. Anne County, Alberta, a locality in Lac Ste. Anne County, Alberta